The 9th District of the Iowa House of Representatives in the state of Iowa.

Current elected officials
Ann Meyer is the representative currently representing the district.

Past representatives
The district has previously been represented by:
 Delbert L. Trowbridge, 1971–1973
 Del Stromer, 1973–1983
 Ruhl Maulsby, 1983–1993
 Thomas H. Miller, 1993–1995
 Dan Huseman, 1995–2003
 George Eichhorn, 2003–2007
 McKinley Bailey, 2007–2011
 Stewart Iverson, 2011–2013
 Helen Miller, 2013–2019
 Ann Meyer, 2019–present

References

009